Fenosoa Ratolojanahary (born 1 August 1986) is a retired Malagasy football defender.

References

1986 births
Living people
Malagasy footballers
Madagascar international footballers
CNaPS Sport players
Association football defenders